William, Bill or Billy Coyle may refer to:

 William R. Coyle (1878–1962), U.S. Representative from Pennsylvania
 William J. Coyle (1888–1977), Lieutenant Governor of Washington
 Bill Coyle (baseball), pitcher in Major League Baseball
 Bill Coyle (poet), American poet and translator
 Billy Coyle (footballer) (born 1926), English footballer
 Billy Coyle, candidate in the United States House of Representatives elections in Oklahoma, 2010